Gita Irawan Wirjawan (born 21 September 1965) is an Indonesian investment banker, entrepreneur, philanthropist, musician, and podcaster. Previously, he served as Minister of Trade of the Republic of Indonesia during President Susilo Bambang Yudhoyono's Kabinet Indonesia Bersatu II (Second United Indonesia Cabinet). He is the founder of Ancora Group and Ancora Foundation. He was the head of Badminton Association of Indonesia from 2012 to 2016.

Personal life
Gita Wirjawan was born in Jakarta to Paula Warokka and Wirjawan Djojosugito. He has Minahasan and Javanese ancestry. The youngest of five children, Wirjawan attended Budi Waluyo Elementary School and Pangudi Luhur Junior High School in Jakarta before moving to Bangladesh, and later to India, at the age of thirteen as his father was serving as a WHO officer in Bangladesh.

Wirjawan earned a bachelor's degree in Business Administration from the University of Texas, Austin in 1988, a master's degree in Business Administration from Baylor University in 1989, and a master's degree in Public Administration from Harvard University's Harvard Kennedy School as a Mason Fellow in 2000.  He also qualified as a Certified Public Accountant in the U.S. state of Texas and holds a Chartered Financial Analyst designation.

An avid musician, Wirjawan met his wife, Yasmin Stamboel, while teaching piano lessons during his college summer break. The couple got married in 1993 and have three children.

Business career
Wirjawan began his career as an auditor at the firm of Morrison Brown & Argiz in Miami, Florida in 1989. He joined Citibank in Indonesia in 1992 in the Consumer Banking department, becoming a vice president in 1997. From July 1997 to May 1999 Wirjawan was a Director of Corporate Finance at Bahana Securities, Indonesia.  He joined Goldman Sachs, Singapore in July 2000 as a Vice President in the Investment Banking Division, followed by a stint at Singapore Technologies Telemedia as a Senior Vice President, International Business Development from 2003 until 2004. From 2004 to 2008 Wirjawan served as a Senior Country Officer and President Director JP Morgan Indonesia.

After leaving JP Morgan in April 2008, Wirjawan established the Ancora Group, focusing on investments in Indonesia. Ancora Capital, a private equity arm of the Group, invests primarily in growth companies in the middle market segment across the consumer and natural resources sectors.

Wirjawan left the Ancora Group in October 2009 to begin his public service until the early part of 2014.

Public service
President Susilo Bambang Yudhoyono appointed Wirjawan as Chairman of Indonesia's Investment Coordinating Board (BKPM) in October 2009.  Under his leadership, foreign direct investments in Indonesia almost doubled from US$11bn in 2009 to $19bn in 2011.

Wirjawan was appointed as Minister of Trade of Indonesia in October 2011.  One of his biggest accomplishments in this role was, as Chairman of the Ninth World Trade Organization Ministerial Conference of 2013 held in Bali 37 December 2013, leading the 159 members of the WTO to agree to a package to ease international trade barriers. Also notable was that under his leadership, Trade Law was finally passed by the House of Representatives on 11 February, a new milestone for the country after 80 years of using the previous Dutch-era law.

In February 2014, Wirjawan resigned from his position as Minister of Trade to participate in the Democratic Party Convention as a Presidential Candidate.

In July 2014, Wirjawan decided to return to Ancora Group.

Board memberships
Wirjawan currently sits on the international advisory board of ACE Group and at Singapore Management University (SMU). Previously, he served as a Commissioner of state-owned oil and gas company Pertamina, an Independent Board Director of Axiata Group Berhad, and Independent Commissioner of Axiata Excelcomindo.

Wirjawan is a senior fellow at the Zbigniew Brzezinski Institute on Geostrategy at the Center for Strategic and International Studies in Washington D.C. He is also a member of the Dean's Leadership Council for the S. Rajaratnam School of International Studies at Nanyang Technological University.

Philanthropy
Wirjawan has keen interest in education and the important role it could play to propel Indonesia into the ranks of developed nations. He established Ancora Foundation with the mission of helping both early stage education and graduate studies for talented Indonesians. Ancora Foundation has sponsored the training of teachers at 450 kindergartens serving underprivileged children throughout Indonesia, the beneficiaries of which are called "Sekolah Rakyat Ancora".  Wirjawan has endowed scholarships for Indonesians to attend top universities around the world, including Harvard University, University of Oxford, Stanford University, University of Cambridge, Universiti Malaya, Nanyang Technological University,  and  Sciences Po. Since its establishment, the scholarship programme has sent 42 Indonesians to these leading universities .
An  avid  golfer since he was ten years old,  Wirjawan  set  up  Ancora Golf Institute and Ancora Sports to groom future Indonesian golfers. Through its programmes, Ancora Sports has scouted and sponsored young talents such as George Gandranata, Rory Hie, and Jordan Irawan to become top golfers in Indonesia.

Music
Learning piano since the age of 6, Wirjawan is an ardent jazz musician. He has performed in concerts (such as Java Jazz and Bob James Concert) and written songs for several albums. His musical passion prompted Wirjawan to establish Omega Pacific Production/Ancora Music to help young talented musicians. He has produced, composed, distributed, and/or played on fourteen albums, with different musical genres including jazz, pop, lounge, boy band and world music (Cherokee, Bali Lounge, Nial Djuliarso at Juilliard, Tompi, Asia Beat, Bali Lounge 2, Ken, Nial - New Day New Hope, Miss Kadaluarsa, Elvyn Masassya - Titik Balik, Smash and Dewi Lestari - RectoVerso).

Badminton Association of Indonesia
On 14 December 2012, Wirjawan was elected as the Chairman of Indonesian Badminton Association (Persatuan Bulutangkis Seluruh Indonesia, "PBSI") for the 2012-2016 period. Wirjawan set the goal of returning Indonesia to the top ranks of badminton, as the country was in the 1970s and 1980s.   To ensure the athletes can still get formal education while in training, Wirjawan set up a 'home-school' for athletes inside the training camp.  Under his chairmanship, Indonesia has so far won three gold medals at the World Championships, 4 titles at the All England Championships, overall champion at the Southeast Asian Games in 2013 and 2015, 2 titles at the 2014 Asian Games in Incheon, South Korea and 1 titles Summer Olympic 2016 in  Rio de Janeiro, Brazil.

Honours and awards
In July 2013, Wirjawan was awarded an honorary designation of 'Sangaji Gam Ma Lamo' from the Sultan of Ternate, North Molucca, Indonesia, for his role in preserving Indonesia's local customs and heritage. In December 2013, he received an honorary doctorate in business administration from Naresuan University in Phitsanulok, Thailand in recognition of his role in developing the economy and supporting the future of youth in Indonesia. He was awarded a knighthood of 'KRT Djojonegoro' from Pakualaman Palace, Yogyakarta, in January 2014 for his active contribution in maintaining the Pakualaman cultural heritage. In October 2014, President Soesilo Bambang Yudhoyono awarded him Bintang Mahaputra Adipradana in recognition of his extraordinary contribution, as a cabinet member, to his respective field that benefits the country and the nation.

References

External links

1965 births
Living people
Javanese people
Minahasa people
Indonesian businesspeople
Trade ministers of Indonesia
Badminton in Indonesia
CFA charterholders
Harvard Kennedy School alumni
Baylor University alumni
McCombs School of Business alumni
Citigroup people
Goldman Sachs people
Directors of JPMorgan Chase
Mason Fellows